A system of plant taxonomy, the Thorne system of plant classification was devised by the American botanist Robert F. Thorne (1920–2015) in 1968, and he continued to issue revisions over many years (1968–2007).

Some versions of the system are available online. The Bioinformatics Working Group Center for the Study of Digital Libraries at Texas A&M University lists the March 1999 version (and other classification systems). James Reveal's course lecture notes (1999) also gives an account of the Thorne system at that time, with an extensive listing of synonyms, both nomenclatural and taxonomic, for each name in the system together with several other classification systems.

For a discussion of the various suffixes used for superorders (-florae vs. -anae), see Brummitt 1992, and Thorne 1992. In this latter paper, Thorne sets out his reasons for abandoning -florae for -anae, following contemporary practice.

1968 System

Monocotyledons 
Superorders
 Superorder Alimatiflorae
 Superorder Triuridiflorae
 Superorder Liliiflorae
 Order Liliales
 Superorder Ariflorae
 Superorder Commeliniflorae

1992 System 
The 1992 system lists 69 orders and 440 families

Summary 
 Class Magnoliopsida [= angiosperms ]
 Subclass Magnoliidae [= dicotyledons ]
 Superorder Magnolianae
 Superorder Nymphaeanae
 Superorder Rafflesianae
 Superorder Caryophyllanae
 Superorder Theanae
 Superorder Celastranae
 Superorder Malvanae
 Superorder Violanae
 Superorder Santalanae
 Superorder Geranianae
 Superorder Rutanae
 Superorder Proteanae
 Superorder Rosanae
 Superorder Cornanae
 Superorder Asteranae
 Superorder Solananae
 Superorder Loasanae
 Superorder Myrtanae
 Superorder Gentiananae
 Subclass Liliidae [= monocotyledons ]
 Superorder Lilianae
 Superorder Hydatellanae
 Superorder Triuridanae
 Superorder Alismatanae
 Superorder Aranae
 Superorder Cyclanthanae
 Superorder Pandananae
 Superorder Arecanae
 Superorder Commelinanae

Magnoliidae 
 Subclass Magnoliidae [= dicotyledons ]
 Superorder Magnolianae
 Order Magnoliales
 Family Winteraceae
 Family Illiciaceae
 Family Schisandraceae
 Family Magnoliaceae
 Family Degeneriaceae
 Family Himantandraceae
 Family Eupomatiaceae
 Family Annonaceae
 Family Aristolochiaceae
 Family Myristicaceae
 Family Canellaceae
 Family Austrobaileyaceae
 Family Amborellaceae
 Family Trimeniaceae
 Family Chloranthaceae
 Family Monimiaceae
 Family Gomortegaceae
 Family Calycanthaceae
 Family Lauraceae
 Family Hernandiaceae
 Family Lactoridaceae
 Family Saururaceae
 Family Piperaceae
 Order Ceratophyllales
 Family Ceratophyllaceae
 Order Nelumbonales
 Family Nelumbonaceae
 Order Paeoniales
 Family Paeoniaceae
 Family Glaucidiaceae
 Order Berberidales
 Family Menispermaceae
 Family Lardizabalaceae
 Family Sargentodoxaceae
 Family Berberidaceae
 Family Hydrastidaceae
 Family Ranunculaceae
 Family Circaeasteraceae
 Family Papaveraceae
 Superorder Nymphaeanae
 Order Nymphaeales
 Family Cabombaceae
 Family Nymphaeaceae
 Superorder Rafflesianae
 Order Rafflesiales
 Family Hydnoraceae
 Family Rafflesiaceae
 Superorder Caryophyllanae
 Order Caryophyllales
 Family Caryophyllaceae
 Family Portulacaceae
 Family Hectorellaceae
 Family Basellaceae
 Family Didiereaceae
 Family Cactaceae
 Family Phytolaccaceae
 Family Petiveriaceae
 Family Agdestidaceae
 Family Barbeuiaceae
 Family Achatocarpaceae
 Family Stegnospermataceae
 Family Nyctaginaceae
 Family Aizoaceae
 Family Halophytaceae
 Family Molluginaceae
 Family Chenopodiaceae
 Family Amaranthaceae
 Superorder Theanae
 Order Theales
 Family Dilleniaceae
 Family Actinidiaceae
 Family Paracryphiaceae
 Family Stachyuraceae
 Family Theaceae
 Family Asteropeiaceae
 Family Tetrameristaceae
 Family Pellicieraceae
 Family Chrysobalanaceae
 Family Symplocaceae
 Family Caryocaraceae
 Family Marcgraviaceae
 Family Oncothecaceae
 Family Aquifoliaceae
 Family Phellinaceae
 Family Sphenostemonaceae
 Family Sarraceniaceae
 Family Pentaphylacaceae
 Family Clethraceae
 Family Cyrillaceae
 Family Ochnaceae
 Family Quiinaceae
 Family Scytopetalaceae
 Family Medusagynaceae
 Family Strasburgeriaceae
 Family Ancistrocladaceae
 Family Dioncophyllaceae
 Family Nepenthaceae
 Family Bonnetiaceae
 Family Clusiaceae
 Family Elatinaceae
 Family Lecythidaceae
 Order Ericales
 Family Ericaceae
 Family Epacridaceae
 Family Empetraceae
 Order Fouquieriales
 Family Fouquieriaceae
 Order Styracales
 Family Ebenaceae
 Family Lissocarpaceae
 Family Sapotaceae
 Family Styracaceae
 Order Primulales
 Family Theophrastaceae
 Family Myrsinaceae
 Family Primulaceae
 Family Plumbaginaceae
 Order Polygonales
 Family Polygonaceae
 Superorder Celastranae
 Order Celastrales
 Family Celastraceae
 Family Goupiaceae
 Family Lophopyxidaceae
 Family Stackhousiaceae
 Family Corynocarpaceae
 Superorder Malvanae
 Order Malvales
 Family Sterculiaceae
 Family Huaceae
 Family Elaeocarpaceae
 Family Plagiopteraceae
 Family Tiliaceae
 Family Monotaceae
 Family Dipterocarpaceae
 Family Sarcolaenaceae
 Family Sphaerosepalaceae
 Family Bombacaceae
 Family Malvaceae
 Order Urticales
 Family Ulmaceae
 Family Moraceae
 Family Cecropiaceae
 Family Barbeyaceae
 Family Urticaceae
 Family Cannabaceae
 Order Rhamnales
 Family Rhamnaceae
 Family Elaeagnaceae
 Order Euphorbiales
 Family Euphorbiaceae
 Family Aextoxicaceae
 Family Simmondsiaceae
 Family Dichapetalaceae
 Family Gonystylaceae
 Family Thymelaeaceae
 Superorder Violanae
 Order Violales
 Family Bixaceae
 Family Cochlospermaceae
 Family Cistaceae
 Family Violaceae
 Family Flacourtiaceae
 Family Physenaceae
 Family Lacistemataceae
 Family Salicaceae
 Family Dipentodontaceae
 Family Peridiscaceae
 Family Scyphostegiaceae
 Family Passifloraceae
 Family Turneriaceae
 Family Malesherbiaceae
 Family Achariaceae
 Family Caricaceae
 Family Tamaricaceae
 Family Frankeniaceae
 Family Cucurbitaceae
 Family Begoniaceae
 Family Datiscaceae
 Order Brassicales
 Family Resedaceae
 Family Capparaceae
 Family Brassicaceae
 Family Salvadoraceae
 Family Gyrostemonaceae
 Order Batales
 Family Bataceae
 Superorder Santalanae
 Order Santalales
 Family Olacaceae
 Family Opiliaceae
 Family Medusandraceae
 Family Santalaceae
 Family Misodendraceae
 Family Loranthaceae
 Family Eremolepidaceae
 Family Viscaceae
 Order Balanophorales
 Family Balanophoraceae
 Family Cynomoriaceae
 Superorder Geranianae
 Order Linales
 Family Humiriaceae
 Family Ctenolophonaceae
 Family Hugoniaceae
 Family Ixonanthaceae
 Family Linaceae
 Family Erythroxylaceae
 Family Zygophyllaceae
 Family Balanitaceae
 Order Rhizophorales
 Family Rhizophoraceae
 Order Geraniales
 Family Oxalidaceae
 Family Geraniaceae
 Family Balsaminaceae
 Family Tropaeolaceae
 Family Limnanthaceae
 Order Polygalales
 Family Malpighiaceae
 Family Trigoniaceae
 Family Vochysiaceae
 Family Polygalaceae
 Family Krameriaceae
 Superorder Rutanae
 Order Rutales
 Family Rutaceae
 Family Rhabdodendraceae
 Family Cneoraceae
 Family Simaroubaceae
 Family Picramniaceae
 Family Ptaeroxylaceae
 Family Meliaceae
 Family Burseraceae
 Family Anacardiaceae
 Family Leitneriaceae
 Family Tepuianthaceae
 Family Coriariaceae
 Family Sapindaceae
 Family Sabiaceae
 Family Melianthaceae
 Family Akaniaceae
 Family Bretschneideraceae
 Family Moringaceae
 Family Surianaceae
 Family Connaraceae
 Family Fabaceae
 Superorder Proteanae
 Order Proteales
 Family Proteaceae
 Superorder Rosanae
 Order Hamamelidales
 Family Trochodendraceae
 Family Eupteleaceae
 Family Cercidiphyllaceae
 Family Platanaceae
 Family Hamamelidaceae
 Order Casuarinales
 Family Casuarinaceae
 Order Balanopales
 Family Buxaceae
 Family Didymelaceae
 Family Daphniphyllaceae
 Family Balanopaceae
 Order Bruniales
 Family Roridulaceae
 Family Bruniaceae
 Family Geissolomataceae
 Family Grubbiaceae
 Family Myrothamnaceae
 Family Hydrostachyaceae
 Order Juglandales
 Family Rhoipteleaceae
 Family Juglandaceae
 Family Myricaceae
 Order Betulales
 Family Ticodendraceae
 Family Betulaceae
 Family Nothofagaceae
 Family Fagaceae
 Order Rosales
 Family Rosaceae
 Family Neuradaceae
 Family Crossosomataceae
 Family Anisophylleaceae
 Order Saxifragales
 Family Tetracarpaeaceae
 Family Crassulaceae
 Family Cephalotaceae
 Family Penthoraceae
 Family Saxifragaceae
 Family Francoaceae
 Family Grossulariaceae
 Family Vahliaceae
 Family Eremosynaceae
 Family Lepuropetalaceae
 Family Parnassiaceae
 Family Stylidiaceae
 Family Droseraceae
 Family Greyiaceae
 Family Diapensiaceae
 Order Podostemales
 Family Podostemaceae
 Order Cunoniales
 Family Cunoniaceae
 Family Davidsoniaceae
 Family Staphyleaceae
 Superorder Cornanae
 Order Hydrangeales
 Family Hydrangeaceae
 Family Escalloniaceae
 Family Carpodetaceae
 Family Griseliniaceae
 Family Alseuosmiaceae
 Family Montiniaceae
 Family Brexiaceae
 Family Columelliaceae
 Family Desfontainiaceae
 Order Cornales
 Family Vitaceae
 Family Gunneraceae
 Family Haloragaceae
 Family Cornaceae
 Family Curtisiaceae
 Family Alangiaceae
 Family Garryaceae
 Family Aucubaceae
 Family Aralidiaceae
 Family Eucommiaceae
 Family Icacinaceae
 Family Metteniusaceae
 Family Cardiopteridaceae
 Family Peripterygiaceae
 Order Pittosporales
 Family Pittosporaceae
 Family Byblidaceae
 Family Tremandraceae
 Order Araliales
 Family Helwingiaceae
 Family Torricelliaceae
 Family Araliaceae
 Family Hydrocotylaceae
 Family Apiaceae
 Order Dipsacales
 Family Caprifoliaceae
 Family Adoxaceae
 Family Valerianaceae
 Family Triplostegiaceae
 Family Dipsacaceae
 Family Morinaceae
 Superorder Asteranae
 Order Asterales
 Family Calyceraceae
 Family Asteraceae
 Order Campanulales
 Family Menyanthaceae
 Family Pentaphragmataceae
 Family Sphenocleaceae
 Family Campanulaceae
 Family Goodeniaceae
 Superorder Solananae
 Order Solanales
 Family Solanaceae
 Family Duckeodendraceae
 Family Goetzeaceae
 Family Nolanaceae
 Family Convolvulaceae
 Family Hydrophyllaceae
 Family Boraginaceae
 Family Hoplestigmataceae
 Family Lennoaceae
 Family Tetrachondraceae
 Family Polemoniaceae
 Superorder Loasanae
 Order Loasales
 Family Loasaceae
 Superorder Myrtanae
 Order Myrtales
 Family Lythraceae
 Family Alzateaceae
 Family Rhynchocalycaceae
 Family Penaeaceae
 Family Oliniaceae
 Family Trapaceae
 Family Crypteroniaceae
 Family Melastomataceae
 Family Combretaceae
 Family Onagraceae
 Family Myrtaceae
 Superorder Gentiananae
 Order Gentianales
 Family Loganiaceae
 Family Rubiaceae
 Family Dialypetalanthaceae
 Family Apocynaceae
 Family Gentianaceae
 Family Saccifoliaceae
 Order Scrophulariales
 Family Oleaceae
 Family Buddlejaceae
 Family Stilbaceae
 Family Bignoniaceae
 Family Pedaliaceae
 Family Martyniaceae
 Family Myoporaceae
 Family Scrophulariaceae
 Family Gesneriaceae
 Family Globulariaceae
 Family Plantaginaceae
 Family Lentibulariaceae
 Family Acanthaceae
 Family Callitrichaceae
 Family Hippuridaceae
 Family Verbenaceae
 Family Phrymaceae
 Family Symphoremataceae
 Family Nesogenaceae
 Family Avicenniaceae
 Family Lamiaceae

Liliidae 
 Subclass Liliidae [= monocotyledons ]
 Superorder Lilianae
 Order Liliales
 Family Melanthiaceae
 Family Campynemataceae
 Family Alstroemeriaceae
 Family Colchicaceae
 Family Liliaceae
 Family Trilliaceae
 Family Iridaceae
 Order Burmanniales
 Family Burmanniaceae
 Family Corsiaceae
 Order Asparagales
 Family Asparagaceae
 Family Luzuriagaceae
 Family Asphodelaceae
 Family Aphyllanthaceae
 Family Phormiaceae
 Family Tecophilaeaceae
 Family Lanariaceae
 Family Hemerocallidaceae
 Family Asteliaceae
 Family Hanguanaceae
 Family Agavaceae
 Family Hostaceae
 Family Blandfordiaceae
 Family Dasypogonaceae
 Family Xanthorrhoeaceae
 Family Ixioliriaceae
 Family Hyacinthaceae
 Family Alliaceae
 Family Amaryllidaceae
 Family Hypoxidaceae
 Family Velloziaceae
 Family Cyanastraceae
 Family Eriospermaceae
 Order Dioscoreales
 Family Philesiaceae
 Family Ripogonaceae
 Family Petermanniaceae
 Family Smilacaceae
 Family Dioscoreaceae
 Family Trichopodaceae
 Family Stemonaceae
 Family Taccaceae
 Order Orchidales
 Family Orchidaceae
 Superorder Hydatellanae
 Order Hydatellales
 Family Hydatellaceae
 Superorder Triuridanae
 Order Triuridales
 Family Triuridaceae
 Superorder Alismatanae
 Order Alismatales
 Family Butomaceae
 Family Alismataceae
 Family Hydrocharitaceae
 Order Potamogetonales
 Family Aponogetonaceae
 Family Scheuchzeriaceae
 Family Juncaginaceae
 Family Potamogetonaceae
 Family Posidoniaceae
 Family Cymodoceaceae
 Family Zannichelliaceae
 Family Zosteraceae
 Superorder Aranae
 Order Acorales
 Family Acoraceae
 Order Arales
 Family Araceae
 Family Lemnaceae
 Superorder Cyclanthanae
 Order Cyclanthales
 Family Cyclanthaceae
 Superorder Pandananae
 Order Pandanales
 Family Pandanaceae
 Superorder Arecanae
 Order Arecales
 Family Arecaceae
 Superorder Commelinanae
 Order Bromeliales
 Family Bromeliaceae
 Order Philydrales
 Family Philydraceae
 Family Pontederiaceae
 Family Haemodoraceae
 Order Typhales
 Family Typhaceae
 Order Zingiberales
 Family Musaceae
 Family Strelitziaceae
 Family Lowiaceae
 Family Heliconiaceae
 Family Zingiberaceae
 Family Costaceae
 Family Cannaceae
 Family Marantaceae
 Order Commelinales
 Family Rapateaceae
 Family Xyridaceae
 Family Commelinaceae
 Family Mayacaceae
 Family Eriocaulaceae
 Order Juncales
 Family Thurniaceae
 Family Juncaceae
 Family Cyperaceae
 Order Poales
 Family Flagellariaceae
 Family Joinvilleaceae
 Family Restionaceae
 Family Ecdeiocoleaceae
 Family Centrolepidaceae
 Family Poaceae

2007 System 

The 2007 system lists 12 subclasses, 35 superorders, 87 orders, 40 suborders, and 472 families. It uses the suffixes given in the following example.

Class Magnoliopsida ("Angiospermae") - 12 subclasses
 Subclass Magnoliidae
 Superorder: Magnolianae
 Order: Magnoliales
 SubOrder: Magnoliineae
 Family: Magnoliaceae
 SubFamily: Magnolioideae
 Tribe: Magnolieae

Subclasses (12)
 1. Chloranthidae
 2. Magnoliidae [= dicotyledons]
 3. Alismatidae
 4. Liliidae  - 3 superorders
   Pandananae
   Dioscoreanae
  Lilianae - 3 orders
   Liliales - 12 families
   Corsiaceae Becc., 1878
   Campynemataceae Dumort., 1829
   Melanthiaceae Batsch ex Borkh., 1797
   Trilliaceae Chevall., 1827
   Petermanniaceae Hutch., 1934
   Luzuriagaceae Lotsy, 1911 (incl. Drymophila R. Br.) 
   Alstroemeriaceae Dumort., 1829
   Colchicaceae DC., 1804
   Rhipogonaceae Conran & Clifford, 1985
   Philesiaceae Dumort., 1829
   Smilacaceae Vent., 1799
   Liliaceae Juss., 1789
   Orchidales
   Iridales
 5. Commelinidae
 6. Ranunculidae
 7. Hamamelididae
 8. Caryophyllidae
 9. Rosidae
 10. Malvidae
 11. Asteridae
 12. Lamiidae
Note: Monocotyledons are represented here by 3 separate subclasses 3–5

References

Bibliography

Works by Thorne 
 
 
 
 
 
 
 
 

system, Thorne (1992)